Fred Everything (born Frédéric Blais in Hull, Quebec) is a French-Canadian electronic musician and DJ, best known for his work in the deep house music genre.

Early life
Blais was brought up in Quebec City, where he gained an interest in synthesis and editing techniques from a young age. He later went on to perform in several live bands and compose music for theatre. His interest in dance music began with the acid house movement, particularly UK label Warp Records' releases.

Career
In the early 90s, he started playing live in raves and clubs in Canada. He was then known as "Everything", because his live sets could range anywhere from techno to house, ambient and even drum and bass. Fred Everything's career as a DJ began in 1993, when he opened for Sasha at the Metropolis club night in Montreal. After building up a reputation in the US and Canada, he moved to Montreal in 1996, where he released many records under various record labels, including 20:20 Vision, with whom he went on to release a total of 20 records, including his widely successful album "Under the Sun" in 2000.

Fred Everything became popular in Europe in 1997 when he performed at a festival in Glasgow, Scotland. Two years later, he moved to London for three months to do an extended European tour whilst also doing production work with numerous other Deep House artists, including AtJazz, Nigel Hayes and Bougie Soliterre.

Towards the end of the 90s, a remix of Derrick Carter's "Life Is Like A Circle", as well as the release of Under the Sun gave Fred Everything more popularity as a remixer. He went on to remix a large number of tracks, the most well known of these being his remix of Bran Van 3000 and Roy Davis Jnr.'s track "Watch Them Come". This  led to a compilation of his remixes, "From The Deep- a collection of remixes 1998-2001", being released by Bombay Records in 2002. As well as his production work, he had begun writing articles on house music for the San Francisco-based music journal XLR8R. He also won two awards at the Mimi gala that year, which voted him "best DJ in Montreal" and "best electronic artist".

References

Living people
Canadian electronic musicians
Canadian house musicians
Deep house musicians
Musicians from Gatineau
Year of birth missing (living people)